

160001–160100 

|-
| 160001 Bakonybél ||  || The ancient village of Bakonybél (founded in 1018) is located in the heart of the High Bakony Landscape Protection Area || 
|-id=013
| 160013 Elbrus || 1294 T-2 || Mount Elbrus, the highest mountain of the Caucasus in Russia || 
|}

160101–160200 

|-id=105
| 160105 Gobi ||  || The Gobi Desert, a large region in Asia, covering parts of southern Mongolia and northwestern China, historically known for being part of the Mongol Empire, and for the location of several important cities along the Silk Road. || 
|}

160201–160300 

|-id=215
| 160215 Haines-Stiles ||  || Geoffrey Haines-Stiles (born 1948) served as the Public Outreach Cinematographer for the New Horizons mission to Pluto. || 
|-id=259
| 160259 Mareike ||  || Mareike Hönig (born 1981), German mathematician and wife of the discoverer Sebastian F. Hönig || 
|}

160301–160400 

|-bgcolor=#f2f2f2
| colspan=4 align=center | 
|}

160401–160500 

|-id=493
| 160493 Nantou ||  || Nantou County is located at the geographical center of Taiwan || 
|}

160501–160600 

|-id=512
| 160512 Franck-Hertz ||  || James Franck (1882–1964) and Gustav Hertz (1887–1975) received the Nobel Prize for Physics in 1925 || 
|}

160601–160700 

|-bgcolor=#f2f2f2
| colspan=4 align=center | 
|}

160701–160800 

|-bgcolor=#f2f2f2
| colspan=4 align=center | 
|}

160801–160900 

|-bgcolor=#f2f2f2
| colspan=4 align=center | 
|}

160901–161000 

|-id=903
| 160903 Shiokaze ||  || The Japan Railway's express train Shiokaze was inaugurated in 1972, connecting Uwajima with Takamatsu, Japan || 
|}

References 

160001-161000